Operation Guava is the code name for a long-term British Security Service (MI5) operation. The operation tracked a terrorist cell, which planned "a significant terrorist plot." The Operation Guava plotters used the Al-Qaeda in the Arabian Peninsula magazine Inspire as an instruction manual for the bomb they planned to leave in a toilet stall at the London Stock Exchange.

Name
The book sources and government reports all refer to the case as "Operation Guava".  Some contemporaneous (2010–2012) news reports refer to a "Christmas plot" or "London Stock Exchange bombing."  Other press reports (2012–2019) use "Operation Guava".

Plot
Aside from bombing the London Stock Exchange, the plotters planned the establishment of a jihadist training camp in Azad Kashmir on land owned by one of the suspects, Usman Khan. The plotters were monitored by covert listening device and found to be engaged in Holocaust denial by claiming that fewer than 100,000 Jews died in the Holocaust. Other targets included: the US Embassy in London, two rabbis each from a separate synagogue, the Dean of St Paul's Cathedral, and Boris Johnson; the plotters had procured their addresses. All the conspirators envisioned returning experienced, together with future recruits, from their Kashmiri training camp to execute terror attacks in the UK

The conspirators further reconnoitred several additional targets, including Big Ben, the London Eye, and Westminster Abbey.

The terrorist network was composed of individuals from Birmingham, Cardiff, East London, and Stoke-on-Trent.  The main focus of the East London group was to attack targets in the UK.  The most active was the Stoke group, which had as primary goal to set up the terrorist camp to be disguised as a madrassa, though bombing pubs in Stoke was also discussed.  The Stoke cell was described by the prosecution as having "well developed" field craft, and being concerned about being arrested on account of the other groups' naiveté.  The Stoke group's sophistication disturbed authorities the most.

Convictions
The conspirators were arrested in December 2010; all nine network members pled guilty and eight were convicted of engaging in preparation for acts of terrorism.

Three of the nine (Mohammad Shahjahan, Nazam Hussein, and Usman Khan), all from Stoke, were given indefinite prison terms, on account of being considered "more dangerous than the others".  Nonetheless, an appellate judge determined that this characterisation was "unfair" and their sentences were reduced to between 16 and 17 years' prison each. Mohammad Shahjahan had previously been featured in a 2010 documentary produced by the BBC about people called Mohammed, on which he was presented as a former Muslims4UK member. Usman Khan later on went on to take part in a Cambridge University rehabilitation programme where he was considered a "poster boy for Britain's anti-radicalisation strategy" and later yet perpetrated the 2019 London Bridge stabbing, when he killed two people and wounded three more.

The 'lynchpin' of the plot was Mohammed Chowdury, also spelled Chowdhury.

Notes

References

Counterterrorism in the United Kingdom
MI5
Police raids on Islamists
Islamic terrorism in England